A maritime disaster is an event which usually involves a ship or ships and can involve military action. Because of the nature of maritime travel, there is often a substantial loss of life. The term maritime disaster can refer to both commercial ships and military naval ships. A maritime disaster can result in one or more of the following simultaneously;
Loss of life
Pollution of marine environment (in case of oil spill, foul discharge of materials, sulphur emitted from fuels, etc.)
Degradation of the aquatic ecosystem
Economical loss at a grand scale
Destruction of onshore properties (accidents at harbor are not only limited to the vessels but also damage the nearest lands)
There are countless incidents reported on marine disasters.

The sinking of the British ocean liner  in 1912, with over 1,500 fatalities, is probably the most famous shipwreck, but not the biggest in terms of lives lost. The wartime sinking of the German  in January 1945 in World War II by a Soviet Navy submarine, with an estimated loss of about 9,400 people, remains the deadliest isolated maritime disaster ever, excluding such events as the destruction of entire fleets like the 1274 and 1281 storms that are said to have devastated Kublai Khan's fleets in his invasions of Japan. The 1987 loss of the Philippine ferry , with an estimated 4,386 dead, is the largest peacetime loss recorded.

Peacetime
Many maritime disasters happen outside the realms of war. All ships, including those of the military, are vulnerable to problems from weather conditions, faulty design or human error. Some of the disasters below occurred in periods of conflict, although their losses were unrelated to any military action. The table listings are in descending order with respect to the number of casualties suffered.

Wartime
Disasters with high losses of life can occur in times of armed conflict. Shown below are some of the known events with major losses.

Russo-Japanese War

World War I 

 See List of maritime disasters in World War I

Spanish Civil War

World War II 

 See List of maritime disasters in World War II

There are at least eight maritime disasters during WWII, each of which has a greater death toll than any other maritime disaster.

Second Chinese Civil War

Six-Day War

Indo-Pakistani War of 1971

Falklands War

Iran-Iraq War

See also
 List of maritime disasters
 List of maritime disasters in the 18th century
 List of maritime disasters in the 19th century
 List of maritime disasters in World War I
 List of maritime disasters in World War II
 List of maritime disasters in the 21st century
 Shipwreck
 Lists of shipwrecks
 List of disasters
 List of accidents and disasters by death toll
 List by death toll of ships sunk by submarines
 List of RORO vessel accidents

References

External links
 WRECKSITE Worldwide free database of + 65.000 ships wrecked with history, maritime charts and GPS positions
 Titanic Facts The life and loss of the RMS Titanic, in numbers
 G. Duncan. Maritime disasters of World War 2
 World sea disasters timeline, 21st century
 Notable peacetime passenger ship disasters

20th century-related lists
Lists of shipwrecks